Tofaş (acronym for Türk Otomobil Fabrikası Anonim Şirketi; Turkish Automobile Factory Joint-Stock Company pronounced ) is a Turkish automobile manufacturer which was established in 1968 by Vehbi Koç, who was the founder of Koç Holding, based in Bursa, where the manufacturing plant of the company is located. It is jointly owned by Stellantis and Koç Holding (37.8% of the company's shares belong to Stellantis (through Fiat Group Automobiles); 37.8% to Koç Holding; and 24.3% freefloat).

Tofaş manufactures both passenger cars and light commercial vehicles. It is one of the biggest automakers in the sector with its 7,000 employees and 450,000 vehicles annual production capacity. Tofaş manufactures for the Fiat, Citroën, Peugeot, Opel,  Vauxhall and RAM brands in Bursa, which has achieved for it the “Gold Level” within the scope of the WCM-World Class Manufacturing Program that is implemented in the 175 plants within the framework of Stellantis.

Tofaş plays a leading role in Turkish automotive sector; it conducts sales and after sales operations for the Fiat, Alfa Romeo, Lancia, Jeep, Ferrari, and Maserati brands in Turkey.

Tofaş exported 160,000 units to 80 countries in 2013. It also recorded 7 billion TL net sales income and 434 million TL net profit. Fulfilling 22% of the total production in Turkey with its 240,000 units in the previous year, Tofaş achieved 1.6 billion euro export income by increasing its export volume by 4%.

History

1968 — Tofaş was founded.
1969 — the foundation of the company’s production plant was laid in Bursa.
1971 — the first Tofaş model was a Fiat 124, produced under license from Fiat and locally named Murat 124 (with a later version named as Serçe). The first motorsport team was established.
1973 — the OPAR, which was based on automotive spare parts, was founded.
1974 — Tofaş Sport Club was established.
1975 — exports began to Egypt.
1976 — Murat 131 model was produced.
1981 — production began of Kartal and Doğan models.
1990 — Tempra model was produced.
1994 — Uno model was produced.
1994 — Tofaş R&D was established. 
1995 — exporting of Tempra model was started. 
1995 — Koç Finans, which provides consumer financing, was established.
1997 — Tofaş and OPAR were united.
1999 — Marea and Brava models were produced.
2000 — Doblò model started production.
2000 — Tofaş Basketball Volunteer Project was started. 
2001 — Tofaş production plant and Tofaş Oto Ticaret were united. 
2001 — Alfa Romeo started to work together under the roof of Tofaş. 
2002 — Albea model was produced. 
2002 — Tofaş became a leader of sector, a champion of production, export and motor sports. 
2003 — Tofaş Bursa Anatolian Cars and Carriages Museum (Tofaş Anadolu Arabaları Müzesi) was established.
2005 — it became the distributor of Ferrari and Maserati Brands in Turkey and Fer Mas (acronym for Ferrari and Maserati) was founded.
2006 — exports began of Palio and Albea models to Russia. 
2007 — the global launch of Linea.
2007 — official distribution right of Lancia was attained.
2007 — Minicargo project was completed, launched as Fiat Fiorino, also sold to PSA as Peugeot Bipper and Citroën Nemo first time in Tofaş history.
2009 — Albea Sole model was launched. 
2009 — Tofaş Basketball Team stepped up to premier league.
2010 — new Fiat Doblo production started and was awarded as “2011 International Van of the Year”.
2011 — Doblo was started to be produced for Opel and Vauxhall Brands as the Combo.
2012 — the brand of Jeep joined to Tofaş after Fiat and Chrysler global integration.
2012 — 4 millionth vehicle produced since its foundation.
2013 — new model investments named Doblo US, which will be exported to USA and Canada, and Doblo FL were announced.
2013 — new passenger car investment, which would be launched in 2015, was announced.
2013 — Opar and Magneti Marelli made a cooperation agreement for automobile spare part sales.
2013 — Bursa plant achieved the WCM “Gold Level”.
2014 — opening of the new building of Tofaş Academy.
2014 — the protocol for Tofaş Science High School was signed.
2015 — Ram ProMaster City (Doblo US) starts production for North American market.
2015 — Facelifted second generation Doblo starts production.
2015 — Fiat Tipo/Egea sedan starts production.
2016 — Fiat Tipo hatchback and wagon starts production.

Annual production

1972 — 20,000 units
1984 — 35,000 units
1990 — 100,000 units
1993 — 250,000 units
2007 — 360,000 units
2008 — 400,000 units

Models and production years

1971 - Murat 124
1976 - Murat 131
1981 - 131 Kartal and 131 Doğan
1983 - 124 Serçe and 131 Kartal (new body)
1988 - 131 Şahin, Doğan and Kartal (new body)
1990 - Fiat Tempra
1993 - Tipo & Tempra SW
1994 - Fiat Uno
1998 - Fiat Palio, Palio weekend and Siena
1999 - Fiat Marea & Fiat Brava
2000 - Fiat Doblò
2002 - Fiat Albea
2005 - Fiat Linea
2007 - Mini Cargo (Fiat Fiorino - Peugeot Bipper - Citroën Nemo)
2010 - New Fiat Doblò
2012 - New Fiat Linea
2015 - New Fiat Tipo/Egea

Current production
Tofaş currently produces the following models for Stellantis:
 Fiat Fiorino (commercialised by Fiat Professional)
 Fiat Tipo (2015)

Discontinued
Old models the company has produced in the past include:

 Fiat 124, as the Tofaş Murat 124 and later Tofaş Serçe.
 Fiat 131, as the Tofaş Murat 131, Şahin, Doğan, or Kartal.
 Tipo
 Tempra
 Uno
 Brava 
 Linea,
 Marea
 Palio
 Siena
 Albea
Qubo
Citroën Nemo
Peugeot Bipper
 Opel Combo
 Fiat Doblò 
 Ram ProMaster City (Americanised Fiat Doblò)

Logo

See also
Karsan
Pirin-Fiat
Holland Car
Tofaş Museum of Cars and Anatolian Carriages

References

External links
 

Turkish brands
Companies listed on the Istanbul Stock Exchange
Car manufacturers of Turkey
Vehicle manufacturing companies established in 1968
Koç family
Stellantis
1968 establishments in Turkey
Companies based in Bursa